Ngāti Whakaue is a Māori iwi, of the Te Arawa confederation of New Zealand.  The tribe lives in the Rotorua district and descends from the Arawa waka. The Ngāti Whakaue village Ōhinemutu is within the township of Rotorua.

Ngāti Whakaue traces descent from Whakaue Kaipapa, son of Uenuku-kopakō, and grandson of Tūhourangi.

The Ngāti Whakaue chief Pūkākī is depicted on the New Zealand 20 cent coin.

Te Arawa FM is the radio station of Te Arawa iwi, including Ngāti Whakaue, Ngāti Pikiao and Tūhourangi. It was established in the early 1980s and became a charitable entity in November 1990. The station underwent a major transformation in 1993, becoming Whanau FM. One of the station's frequencies was taken over by Mai FM in 1998; the other became Pumanawa FM before later reverting to Te Arawa FM.

See also
Te Papaiouru Marae
Arawa (canoe)

References

External links
Ngāti Whakaue website